William Artur de Oliveira (born 20 October 1982) is a Brazilian football coach and a former player. He is an assistant coach with Zenit St.Petersburg.

Career

Club
Born in São Bernardo do Campo, William Oliveira spent his early career playing with Associação Atlética Caldense with whom he will win the 2002 Campeonato Mineiro. Afterwards he played with Serra Negra in São Paulo, Cascavel Clube Recreativo and Nacional de Rolandia. Then he moved to Mexico to join Puebla F.C. in 2005. That year the club finished top of the Mexican Primera División A becoming the 2005 Apertura champions.

In 2006, he was back to Brazil playing with Esporte Clube Águia Negra but by the end of the year he will move again abroad, this time to play with Serbian First League side FK Srem. His good exhibitions called the attention of Serbian SuperLiga club OFK Beograd who brought him in January 2008.

He scored seven league goals in 22 matches in the Serbian top flight with OFK and by the winter break of the 2008-09 season he was moving to Russia to join Premier League side FC Amkar Perm. He also spent few months with Shinnik Yaroslavl, before joining Dynamo Bryansk in the summer of 2010. He stayed two years in Bryansk, collecting 56 league appearances and scoring one goal. In July 2012, he signed a two-year contract with Ufa.

Coaching
On 15 January 2019, FC Ufa announced that William Oliveira had left his coaching role with Ufa to take up a similar role with Zenit St.Petersburg.

Personal life
On 30 December 2021, he acquired citizenship of Russia.

Career statistics

References

External links
 
 

Brazilian footballers
Brazilian expatriate footballers
Association football midfielders
Association football defenders
Associação Atlética Caldense players
Club Puebla players
Expatriate footballers in Mexico
FK Srem players
OFK Beograd players
Serbian SuperLiga players
Expatriate footballers in Serbia
Brazilian expatriate sportspeople in Serbia
FC Amkar Perm players
FC Shinnik Yaroslavl players
FC Dynamo Bryansk players
FC Ufa players
Russian Premier League players
Expatriate footballers in Russia
Brazilian expatriate sportspeople in Russia
1982 births
Living people
People from São Bernardo do Campo
Naturalised citizens of Russia
Brazilian emigrants to Russia
Brazilian football managers
Russian football managers
Brazilian expatriate football managers
Expatriate football managers in Russia
Footballers from São Paulo (state)